Port Perry Tunnel is a railroad tunnel on the Port Perry Branch in Pennsylvania.

History
The tunnel was built as part of the Port Perry Branch connector between the Main Line and Monongahela Division of the Pennsylvania Railroad. The tunnel (which currently has only one track) was once double-tracked.

See also
 PRR Port Perry Bridge

References

Pennsylvania Railroad tunnels
Railroad tunnels in Pennsylvania
Tunnels in Allegheny County, Pennsylvania